Spinazzola is a town and comune in the province of Barletta-Andria-Trani, Apulia, southern Italy.

People
Pope Innocent XII was born here in the castle of the Pignatelli family, now destroyed.
Michele Ruggieri (1543–1607), Jesuit missionary in China, first European sinologist, was born in Spinazzola.

Twin cities
 Verbania, Italy

References

External links
Official website
 Genealogical Data from Spinazzola

Cities and towns in Apulia